Anthony Crespigny Claude Vivian, 5th Baron Vivian (4 March 1906 – 24 June 1991) was a British impresario-restaurateur from the Vivian family who came to public notice in 1954 when he was shot in the abdomen by Mavis Wheeler (née Mabel Winifred Mary Wright, 1908–1970), the former wife of Horace de Vere Cole and of Sir Mortimer Wheeler, and a former mistress of Augustus John.

Background
Anthony Crespigny Claude Vivian, 5th Baron Vivian was born on 4 March 1906. He was the son of George Crespigny Brabazon Vivian, 4th Baron Vivian and Barbara Fanning.

Public life
In 1952, he was the producer with John Clements of The Happy Marriage at the Duke of York's Theatre, London.

He was a member of the House of Lords from 28 December 1940 until his death on 24 June 1991. He made 90 speeches there; his first recorded speech was on 13 March 1967 and his last on 4 April 1984.

Mavis Wheeler
Vivian commanded tabloid headlines in 1954, when his lover, Mavis Wheeler, the former wife of both Sir Mortimer Wheeler and Horace de Vere Cole, and the mistress of Augustus John, was jailed for six months for shooting him in the abdomen.

At Wheeler's trial, the prosecuting counsel said that her love for Lord Vivian was overpowering and that she was jealous of any attention he showed to other women. This love, the prosecution claimed, had led her to shoot him, on 30 July 1954, at a range of three inches, with intent to murder him at her country cottage at Potterne, Wiltshire.

Marriage and children
Lord Vivian married Victoria Ruth Mary Rosamund Oliphant (10 May 1907 - 1985), daughter of Captain Henry Gerard Laurence Oliphant and Ruth Barry, on 8 March 1930. They had three children:

 Hon Sally Anne Marie Gabrielle Vivian (born 22 September 1930)
 Nicholas Crespigny Laurance Vivian, 6th Baron Vivian (11 December 1935 – 28 February 2004)
 Hon Victor Anthony Ralph Brabazon Vivian (26 March 1940 - 19 July 2013)

References

Barons in the Peerage of the United Kingdom
People educated at Eton College
1906 births
1991 deaths
British shooting survivors
Anthony
Eldest sons of British hereditary barons